The Turton River is a perennial river of the West Gippsland catchment, located in the Gippsland region of the Australian state of Victoria.

Location and features
The Turton River rises below Trapyard Hill, drawing its source from the southeastern slopes of Mount Wellington and the southwestern slopes of the Moroka Range, both part of the Great Dividing Range. The entire course of the river is contained within the Avon Wilderness Park. The river descends  over its  course.

See also

 Rivers of Victoria

References

External links
 
 

West Gippsland catchment
Rivers of Gippsland (region)